Quentin Lacour (born 27 August 1993) is a French professional footballer who plays for Louhans-Cuiseaux.

Club career
Lacour was part of the youth training centre at Bourg-en-Bresse for five years, before signing professional with the club. He made two appearances in the 2015–16 Ligue 2 season.

In June 2016 he signed for CA Bastia in the Championnat National due to lack of playing time at Bourg-en-Bresse. A year later, in June 2017, he moved to FC Villefranche. During his second year at the club, he was part of the Villefranche side which reached the round of 16 in the 2018–19 Coupe de France, in which the club lost 0–3 in extra time to Ligue 1 club  Paris Saint-Germain F.C.

Lacour returned to Bourg-en-Bresse in June 2019.

References

1993 births
Sportspeople from Bourg-en-Bresse
Footballers from Auvergne-Rhône-Alpes
Living people
Association football defenders
French footballers
Football Bourg-en-Bresse Péronnas 01 players
CA Bastia players
FC Villefranche Beaujolais players
Louhans-Cuiseaux FC players
Ligue 2 players
Championnat National players
Championnat National 2 players